Smolensk railway station is the primary passenger railway station for the city of Smolensk in Russia, and an important stop along the Moscow–Brest Railway.

Trains
 Moscow — Smolensk
 Moscow — Minsk
 Moscow — Brest
 Moscow — Warsaw
 Moscow — Prague
 Moscow — Berlin
 Moscow — Kaliningrad
 Novosibirsk — Minsk

References

External links
 Timetable

Railway stations in the Russian Empire opened in 1868
Railway stations in Smolensk Oblast
Moscow Railway
Cultural heritage monuments in Smolensk Oblast
Objects of cultural heritage of Russia of regional significance